The  is the prefectural parliament of Mie.

Its 51 members are elected every four years in 17 districts by single non-transferable vote (SNTV). 15 electoral districts are multi-member districts, two are single-member district where SNTV becomes equivalent to First-past-the-post voting.

The assembly is responsible for enacting and amending prefectural ordinances, approving the budget and voting on important administrative appointments made by the governor including the vice-governors.

Current composition 
The last elections were held in the unified local elections in April 2011, at the same time when centre-right (LDP, Kōmeitō, YP) supported Eikei Suzuki narrowly beat DPJ-supported Naohisa Matsuda in the Mie gubernatorial election. In the assembly election, the Liberal Democratic Party remained strongest party, but the Democratic-Social Democratic group Shinsei Mie ("Renewal Mie") emerged as strongest force. The Japanese Communist Party lost all its seats in 2011.

As of April 30, 2011, the assembly was composed as follows:

Electoral districts 
As in all prefectures, most electoral districts correspond to current cities and former counties (while the counties were abolished as administrative unit in 1921, cities and counties had initially by definition served as electoral districts for prefectural assemblies in the Empire).

References

External links
 Mie Prefectural Assembly 
 Mie Prefectural Board of Elections 

Politics of Mie Prefecture
Prefectural assemblies of Japan